Lygodactylus viscatus is a species of gecko endemic to Zanzibar.

References

Lygodactylus
Reptiles described in 1873